"Górecki" is a 1997 single by Lamb from their debut album Lamb.

The song samples the second movement of Henryk Górecki's Third Symphony, the Symphony of Sorrowful Songs.

The song has been featured in numerous TV shows, movies and video games, including the 2006 Torchwood episode "They Keep Killing Suzie" and the 1998 slasher film I Still Know What You Did Last Summer. The opening lines were sung by Nicole Kidman's character Satine in the 2001 movie Moulin Rouge! It was also used for the launch trailer for Crystal Dynamics''' game Tomb Raider: Underworld in 2008, and featured prominently in a daydream sequence of the first episode of Night and Day, a 2001 ITV serial drama. The song was also mentioned and featured in an episode of soap opera Hollyoaks, transmitted on 10th November 2010.

The song peaked at No. 30 on the UK Singles Chart.

Both tracks "Ear Parcel" and "Lullaby" would later appear on Fear of Fours''.

A cover of the song by Chicane was released on 24 November 2017, followed by remixes on 22 December 2017.

Track listing

CD1
 "Górecki" – 6:30
 "Górecki (instrumental)" – 6:00
 "Ear Parcel" – 7:49
 "Lullaby" – 3:35

CD2
 "Górecki" – 6:30
 "Górecki (edit)" – 3:39
 "Trans Fatty Acid (Kruder & Dorfmeister Session mix)" – 9:00
 "Merge (Jimpster's Jam mix)" – 5:43

12"
 "Górecki" – 6:30
 "Ear Parcel" – 7:49
 "Trans Fatty Acid (Kruder & Dorfmeister Session mix)" – 9:00

12" single-sided promo
 "Górecki (Global Communication Remix)" – 9:46

Both "Górecki (Global Communication Remix)" and "Trans Fatty Acid (Kruder & Dorfmeister Session mix)" were later included on the "Lamb Remixed" compilation (2005).

References

1996 songs
1997 singles
Trip hop songs